Anya Phillips (February 1955 – June 19, 1981) was an American fashion designer and the co-founder of legendary New York nightclub the Mudd Club along with Steve Maas and Diego Cortez. Phillips had an influence on the fashion, sound and look of the New York-based no wave scene of the late 1970s. She was also the manager and girlfriend of New York-based musician James Chance (aka James White).

Biography
Phillips was born in Taiwan. Her mother travelled to Taiwan from Beijing, China before the civil war between the Communist Party and Nationalist party ended in 1949. As the Nationalist Party moved the government to Taiwan while the Communist Party controlled mainland China, her mother was not to return to China due to the political rivalry. Later her mother married a military attaché of the American embassy, Wade Phillips, and gave birth to Anya Phillps and her younger brother Kris Phillips, later known as Fei Xiang. Phillips grew up in Taiwan and on various military bases.

Phillips moved to New York City, where she formed a fake band with Cortez and Duncan Smith in 1977. She had a dominatrix act at CBGB with  Terry Sellers. Phillips worked with Cortez to shoot his film Grutzi Elvis in Munich. In March 1978 Phillips first encountered James Chance and the Contortions, at a Colab benefit for X Motion Picture magazine. Phillips persuaded Mass to open a club, envisioning it as an elegant place called the Molotov Cocktail Lounge. She was to manage the club, but her involvement ended after a dispute with Mass. Instead she went on to manage the Contortions and, for a brief period, Lydia Lunch. For the Contortions' debut album Buy, she photographed Sellers wearing an outfit designed by Phillips for the album's cover artwork. Not knowing how to sew, she designed dresses by tying together strips of cloth. Singer Debbie Harry wore some of Phillips' creations.

She was also involved in New York City's late 70s underground film scene, appearing in Amos Poe's The Foreigner in 1978.

She makes a rare vocal appearance in the recording of the June 1980, James Chance and the Contortions concert in Rotterdam, Holland (tape released on ROIR in 1990), to introduce the band and as backing vocals on "I Danced with a Zombie" and "Melt Yourself Down". 

Phillips died of cancer in June 1981 in Valhalla, New York, at the age of 26.

Notes

References
 
 
 

No wave
1981 deaths
Punk people
Deaths from cancer in New York (state)
Year of birth uncertain
People from Valhalla, New York
Taiwanese people of American descent
American musicians of Chinese descent
Women in punk